Openclinica is an open source clinical data management system that is used to collect clinical trial data.

See also
REDCap

External links
REDCap versus OpenClinica

References

Medical databases